Marie-Claude Arnaud-Delabrière (born 24 February 1963) is a French mathematician, specializing in dynamical systems. She is University Professor of Mathematics at the University of Avignon and a senior member of the Institut Universitaire de France.

Education and career
Arnaud was a mathematics student at the École normale supérieure (Paris) from 1983 to 1987; she earned a bachelor's degree in 1984, an agrégation in 1985, and a diplôme d'études approfondies in 1986. She earned her doctorate in 1990 from Paris Diderot University under the supervision of Michael Herman, and completed a habilitation in 1999 at Paris-Sud University.

After working as an assistant at Louis Pasteur University from 1987 to 1989, and then as a temporary researcher at Paris Diderot University from 1989 to 1991, she became an assistant professor at Paris Diderot University in 1991. In 2001 she moved to Avignon as a full professor.

Recognition
In 2010, Arnaud was a speaker at the International Congress of Mathematicians.
She was named to the Institut Universitaire de France as a senior member in 2013. She became a member of the Academia Europaea in 2020.

References

External links
Home page

1963 births
Living people
French women mathematicians
20th-century French mathematicians
21st-century French mathematicians
Paris Diderot University alumni
Academic staff of the University of Avignon
20th-century women mathematicians
21st-century women mathematicians
Members of Academia Europaea
20th-century French women
21st-century French women